Ašmu-nikal was a Queen consort of Hittite empire.

Biography 
Ašmu-nikal was born as a princess, the daughter of King Tudhaliya I and Queen Nikal-mati. She married a man called Arnuwanda, who later became a king. She had two sons with him: Prince Ašmi-Šarruma and King Tudhaliya II. She is mentioned in one prayer as a Great Queen. She was also a grandmother of Tudhaliya III and Suppiluliuma I.

Gallery

Sources 

Hittite queens
14th-century BC women
Ancient princesses